Oakmont Memorial Park is a cemetery, crematorium and funeral home in Lafayette, California, United States.

Notable interments
 John F. Baldwin Jr. (1915–1966), US Congressman
 Brent Mydland (1952–1990), musician, keyboardist for the Grateful Dead
 Eric Lynch aka Eric the Actor (1975–2014), actor, member of Howard Stern's Wack Pack
 Leonard Michaels (1933–2003), American writer of short stories, novels, and essays

See also
 List of cemeteries in California

References

External links
 Oakmont Memorial Park website
 

Cemeteries in California
Lafayette, California